Zeke Steggall (born 9 July 1971) is a former Australian Olympic snowboarder. He competed at the 1998 and 2002 Winter Olympics. His sister Zali Steggall was an alpine skier and Australia's first individual Olympic medalist. Steggall came 28th out of 34 in 1998 and 26th out of 32 in 2002 in the parallel giant slalom.

He has won two World Cup events and a bronze at the World Championships.

Notes

References
 
 

Australian male snowboarders
Snowboarders at the 1998 Winter Olympics
Snowboarders at the 2002 Winter Olympics
Olympic snowboarders of Australia
Living people
1971 births
People from Manly, New South Wales